The 2018–19 Tulane Green Wave men's basketball team represented Tulane University during the 2018–19 NCAA Division I men's basketball season. The Green Wave, led by third-year head coach Mike Dunleavy Sr., played their home games at Devlin Fieldhouse in New Orleans, Louisiana as fifth-year members of the American Athletic Conference. They finished the season 4–27, 0–18 in AAC play to finish in 12th place. They lost in the first round of the AAC tournament to Memphis.

On March 16, 2019, Tulane announced Dunleavy would not return for the 2019–20 season. He finished 24–69 in three seasons at Tulane.

Previous season 
The Green Wave 14–17, 5–13 in AAC play to finish in 10th place. They lost in the first round of the AAC tournament to Temple.

Offseason

Departures

Incoming Transfers

2018 recruiting class

Roster

Schedule and results

|-
!colspan=9 style=| Exhibition

|-
!colspan=9 style=| Non-conference regular season

|-
!colspan=9 style=| AAC regular season

|-
!colspan=9 style=| AAC tournament

|-

References

Tulane Green Wave men's basketball seasons
Tulane
Tulane
Tulane